Gundari Dam is an earthfill dam located in Chiba Prefecture in Japan. The dam is used for irrigation. The catchment area of the dam is 0.5 km2. The dam impounds about 3  ha of land when full and can store 306 thousand cubic meters of water. The construction of the dam was completed in 2006.

References

Dams in Chiba Prefecture
2006 establishments in Japan